Isolation Songs is the second studio album of the Finnish doom metal band Ghost Brigade.

Track listing

Personnel

Band members
 Manne Ikonen - lead vocals
 Tommi Kiviniemi - guitar
 Wille Naukkarinen - guitar
 Veli-Matti Suihkonen - drums, percussion
 Janne Julin - bass

Guests 
 Aleksi Munter (Swallow the Sun) – keyboard
 Richard Humphries - sound sample on “Secrets Of The Earth”
 Ilari Autio - cello

Production
 Antti Malinen - mixing, engineering, recording
 Pelle Henricsson - mastering

References 

2009 albums
Ghost Brigade (band) albums
Season of Mist albums